The TFF Third League or TFF 3. Lig is the fourth level in the Turkish football league system. The league contains 50 clubs spread out over 4 groups with 10 clubs in Stage 1 (Ranking Groups). The top two clubs from each group qualify to the Promotion Group of Stage 2.The rest of the clubs stay in their groups which are called Classifying Groups and carry over their records from Stage 1.

The tables and the results of the teams playing in TFF 3. Lig Group 2 of Ranking Groups in 2008–09 season are as follows:

Teams

Standings

Results 
Last updated on December 28, 2008

Top scorers 
 Last updated on December 28, 2008

Stadiums

References 

2008–09 TFF Third League